Mandhata is a village in Pratapgarh District, Uttar Pradesh State of India. Mandhata is located 21 km distance from its District Main City Pratapgarh. It is located 150 km distance from its State Main City Lucknow.

Geography 
Geographical Location : Mandhata, Pratapgarh, Uttar Pradesh, India
Geographical Coordinates : 25° 47' 53.5344" North and 81° 52' 52.32036" East

Mandhata is situated at Pratapgarh Uttar Pradesh District and its geographical coordinates are 25° 47' 53.5344" North, 81° 52' 52.32036" East. The town lies through the bank of Bakulahi River.

References

Villages in Pratapgarh district, Uttar Pradesh